A senatorial election was held on November 11, 1969 in the Philippines. While incumbent President Ferdinand Marcos won an unprecedented second full term as President of the Philippines, and his running mate, incumbent Vice President Fernando Lopez was also elected to a third full term as Vice President of the Philippines, their Nacionalista Party-mates also won six of the eight contested seats in the Philippine Senate increasing their majority in the Senate.

Retiring incumbents
There are no retiring incumbents in this election.

Incumbents running elsewhere 
These ran in the middle of their Senate terms. For those losing in their respective elections, they can still return to the Senate to serve out their term, while the winners will vacate their Senate seats, then it would have been contested in a special election concurrently with the next general election.

 Genaro Magsasysay (Liberal, elected as a Nacionalista), ran for vice president and lost 
 Sergio Osmeña Jr. (Liberal), ran for president and lost

Results
The Nacionalista Party won six seats, while the Liberal Party won two.

Five incumbents successfully defended their seats. Liberals Ambrosio Padilla and Gerardo Roxas, and Nacionalistas Jose Diokno, Gil Puyat, and Arturo Tolentino.

Mamintal A.J. Tamano and Rene Espina of the Nacionalistas are the neophyte senators elected in this election.

Nacionalista Lorenzo Sumulong returns to the Senate after last serving in 1967.

Three senators lost their reelection bids: Juan Liwag and Tecla San Andres Ziga of the Liberals, and Nacionalistas' Rodolfo Ganzon.

Key:
 ‡ Seats up
 + Gained by a party from another party
 √ Held by the incumbent
 * Held by the same party with a new senator

Per candidate

Per party

See also
Commission on Elections
7th Congress of the Philippines

References

External links
 The Philippine Presidency Project
 Official website of the Commission on Elections

1969
1969 elections in the Philippines